Krasnokorotkovsky is a rural locality (a khutor) and the administrative center of Krasnokorotkovskoye Rural Settlement, Novoanninsky District, Volgograd Oblast, Russia. The population was 570 in 2010. There are 6 streets.

Geography 
Krasnokorotkovsky is located 10 km north of Novoanninsky (the district's administrative centre) by road. Budennovsky is the nearest rural locality.

References 

Rural localities in Novoanninsky District